San Domingo  is one of the former names of Hispaniola.

San Domingo may also refer to:

 San Domingo (film), a 1970 West German drama film
 Santo Domingo Rebellion, a title sometimes used to refer to the Haitian Revolution (1791–1804)
 San Domingo School, a historic school building located in Maryland, USA
 San Domingo or Ruins of San Domingo, a settlements of the Portuguese in Gambia, West Africa; see History of the Gambia
 Fort San Domingo, a former Spanish fort in Taipei County, Taiwan, today the Tamsui District
 , a 74-gun warship launched in 1809 and sold in 1816
 HMS San Domingo, a planned Battle-class destroyer laid down in 1944 and then cancelled in 1945

See also
 Domingo (name), a surname and given name
 Il furioso all'isola di San Domingo
 Saint Dominic, patron saint in which name is derived
 Santo Domingo (disambiguation)
 São Domingos (disambiguation)
 Domingo (disambiguation)